The spotted buttonquail (Turnix ocellatus) is a species of bird in the family Turnicidae.
It is endemic to the northern Philippines.

References

spotted buttonquail
Birds of Luzon
Endemic birds of the Philippines
spotted buttonquail
Taxonomy articles created by Polbot
Taxa named by Giovanni Antonio Scopoli